Cyclocephala is a genus of scarab beetles from the subfamily Dynastinae (Coleoptera, Scarabaeidae). Beetles of this genus occur from southeastern Canada to Argentina and the West Indies.

Adults of this genus are nocturnal or crepuscular, and are usually attracted to lights.

Selected species

This is a large genus and new species continue to be added.

Cyclocephala almitana
Cyclocephala amazona
Cyclocephala amblyopsis
Cyclocephala atripes
Cyclocephala atripes
Cyclocephala barroensis
Cyclocephala brittoni 
Cyclocephala borealis - Northern masked chafer
Cyclocephala carbonaria
Cyclocephala cartwrighti 
Cyclocephala castanea 
Cyclocephala castaniella
Cyclocephala colasi 
Cyclocephala complanata
Cyclocephala concolor
Cyclocephala confusa
Cyclocephala conspicua
Cyclocephala discicollis
Cyclocephala discolor 
Cyclocephala elegans
Cyclocephala epistomalis
Cyclocephala erotylina
Cyclocephala fasciolata
Cyclocephala fulgurata
Cyclocephala gravis
Cyclocephala gregaria
Cyclocephala hardyi
Cyclocephala herteli 
Cyclocephala hirta - Western masked chafer 
Cyclocephala howdeni
Cyclocephala kaszabi 
Cyclocephala krombeini
Cyclocephala laminata 
Cyclocephala ligyrina 
Cyclocephala lunulata
Cyclocephala lurida 
Cyclocephala macrophylla
Cyclocephala maffafa
Cyclocephala melanae 
Cyclocephala melanocephala 
Cyclocephala modesta
Cyclocephala nigerrima 
Cyclocephala nigritarsis
Cyclocephala nigrobasalis
Cyclocephala nodanotherwon
Cyclocephala pan
Cyclocephala pardolocarnoi
Cyclocephala porioni 
Cyclocephala prolongata 
Cyclocephala puberula
Cyclocephala pubescens
Cyclocephala putrida
Cyclocephala quadripunctata
Cyclocephala rubescens
Cyclocephala sanguinicollis
Cyclocephala santaritae
Cyclocephala sexpunctata
Cyclocephala signaticollis
Cyclocephala sparsa 
Cyclocephala spermophila
Cyclocephala stictica
Cyclocephala testacea
Cyclocephala variabilis
Cyclocephala weidneri
Cyclocephala zodion

Predation 
Several species of Cyclocephala serve as hosts for the parasitic larvae of the South American robber fly Mallophora ruficauda, especially C. signaticollis.

See also
 List of Cyclocephala species

References

Further reading

 
 
 

Scarabaeidae genera
Dynastinae